Rashid Kamilevich Muradymov (born 10 March 1977) is a former Russian football player.

References

1977 births
Living people
Russian footballers
FC KAMAZ Naberezhnye Chelny players
Russian Premier League players
Association football defenders
FC Neftekhimik Nizhnekamsk players